Ühlingen-Birkendorf is a municipality in the district of Waldshut in Baden-Württemberg in Germany.

Notable people
Karl Albiker (1878–1961), sculptor

See also

 List of cities and towns in Germany

References

Waldshut (district)
Baden